Ang Lee  (born October 23, 1954) is a Taiwanese filmmaker. Born in Pingtung County of southern Taiwan, Lee was educated in Taiwan and later in the United States. As a filmmaker Lee's work is known for its emotional charge and exploration of repressed, hidden emotions. During his career, he has received international critical and popular acclaim and a range of accolades.

Lee's early successes included Pushing Hands (1991), The Wedding Banquet (1993), and Eat Drink Man Woman (1994), which explored the relationships and conflicts between tradition and modernity, Eastern and Western; the three films are informally known as the "Father Knows Best" trilogy. The films were critically successful both in his native Taiwan and internationally. His breakthrough in Hollywood was the acclaimed costume drama Sense and Sensibility (1995), which was also his first entirely English-language film. He went on to direct films in a broad range of genres, including the drama The Ice Storm (1997); the Civil War epic Ride with the Devil (1999); the martial arts wuxia drama Crouching Tiger, Hidden Dragon (2000); the superhero blockbuster Hulk (2003); the romantic drama Brokeback Mountain (2005); the erotic espionage period film Lust, Caution (2007); and the magic realist survival drama Life of Pi (2012). 

Lee has been nominated for nine Academy Awards, of which he has won three: Best Foreign Language Film for Crouching Tiger Hidden Dragon and Best Director for Brokeback Mountain and Life of Pi, becoming the first non-white director to win the latter prize. For The Wedding Banquet and Sense and Sensibility, Lee won the Golden Bear at the Berlin International Film Festival; for Brokeback Mountain and Lust Caution, he won the Golden Lion at the Venice Film Festival. Lee is one of four directors to win the Golden Lion twice and the sole filmmaker to have been awarded the Golden Bear twice. Lee has also been awarded Directors Guild of America Awards, Golden Globes and British Academy Film Awards, among others, and is the recipient of the Order of Brilliant Star, the second highest civilian honor bestowed by the government of Taiwan.

Early life and education

Ang Lee was born in a Waishengren family, in a military dependents' village of the Republic of China Armed Forces, located in Chaochou, Pingtung, a southern agricultural county in Taiwan. Both of Lee's parents moved following the end of the Chinese civil war in 1949 from De'an, Kiangsi province in Mainland China to Taiwan. He grew up in a household that put a heavy emphasis on education.

Lee studied in the Provincial Tainan First Senior High School (now National Tainan First Senior High School) where his father was the principal. He was expected to pass the annual Joint College/University Entrance Examination, the only route to a university education in Republic of China. But after failing the exam twice, to the disappointment of his father, he entered a three-year college, the National Arts School (now reorganized and expanded as National Taiwan University of Arts), and graduated in 1975. His father had wanted him to become a professor, but he had become interested in drama and the arts in college. This early frustration set his career on the path of performance art. Seeing Ingmar Bergman's film The Virgin Spring (1960) was a formative experience for him.

After finishing his mandatory military service in the Republic of China Navy (ROCN), Lee went to the US in 1979 to study at the University of Illinois at Urbana–Champaign, where he completed his bachelor's degree in theater in 1980. Originally, Lee was interested in acting, but his challenges with speaking English made it difficult, and he quickly turned to directing. At UIUC, Lee met his future wife, Jane Lin, also a student from Taiwan, who was pursuing her PhD degree. Thereupon, he enrolled at the Tisch School of the Arts of New York University, where he received his MFA in film production. He was a classmate of Spike Lee and worked on the crew of his thesis film, Joe's Bed-Stuy Barbershop: We Cut Heads.

During graduate school, Lee finished a 16mm short film, Shades of the Lake (1982), which won the Best Drama Award in Short Film in Taiwan. His own thesis work, a 43-minute drama, Fine Line (1984), won NYU's Wasserman Award for Outstanding Direction and was also chosen for broadcast by the Public Broadcasting Service.

Life after graduation

Lee's NYU thesis drew attention from the William Morris Agency, the famous talent and literary agency that later represented Lee. At first, though, WMA found Lee few opportunities, and Lee remained unemployed for six years. During this time, he was a full-time house-husband, while his wife Jane Lin, a molecular biologist, was the sole breadwinner for the family of four. This arrangement put enormous pressure on the couple, but with Lin's support and understanding, Lee did not abandon his career in film but continued to generate new ideas from movies and performances. He also wrote several screenplays during this time.

In 1990, Lee submitted two screenplays, Pushing Hands and The Wedding Banquet, to a competition sponsored by Government Information Office of R.O.C., and they came in first and second, respectively. The winning screenplays brought Lee to the attention of Hsu Li-kong, a recently promoted senior manager in a major studio who had a strong interest in Lee's unique style and freshness. Hsu, a first-time producer, invited Lee to direct Pushing Hands, a full-length feature that debuted in 1991.

Career

1990s
The 'Father Knows Best' trilogy

Pushing Hands (1991) was a success in Taiwan both among critics and at the box office. It received eight nominations in the Golden Horse Film Festival, Taiwan's premier film festival. Inspired by the success, Hsu Li-kong collaborated with Lee in their second film, The Wedding Banquet (1993), which won the Golden Bear at the 43rd Berlin International Film Festival and was nominated as the Best Foreign Language Film in both the Golden Globe and the Academy Awards. In all, this film collected eleven Taiwanese and international awards and made Lee a rising star. These first two movies were based on stories of Chinese Americans, and both were filmed in the US.

In 1994, Hsu invited Lee to return to Taiwan to make Eat Drink Man Woman, a film that depicts traditional values, modern relationships, and family conflicts in Taipei. The film was a box office hit and was critically acclaimed. For a second consecutive year, Lee's film received the Best Foreign Language Film nomination in both the Golden Globe and Academy Awards, as well as in the British Academy Awards (BAFTA)s. Eat Drink Man Woman won five awards in Taiwan and internationally, including the Best Director from Independent Spirit.

The three films show the Confucian family at risk and star the Taiwanese actor Sihung Lung to form what has been called Lee's "Father Knows Best" trilogy.

Sense and Sensibility

In 1995, Lee directed Columbia TriStar's British classic Sense and Sensibility. This made Lee a second-time winner of the Golden Bear at the Berlin Film Festival. It was nominated for seven Academy Awards, and won Best Adapted Screenplay for screenwriter Emma Thompson, who also starred in the movie alongside Alan Rickman, Hugh Grant and Kate Winslet. Sense and Sensibility also won the Golden Globe Award for Best Motion Picture - Drama. Thompson has described the experience of working with Lee in his first English language film, noting how taken aback Lee was when the actors asked questions or provided suggestions, something Thompson notes as uncommon in Chinese culture. Once this disjuncture was bridged, Thompson remembered having "the most wonderful time because his notes were so brutal and funny."

After this, Lee directed two more Hollywood movies: The Ice Storm (1997), a drama set in 1970s suburban America, and Ride with the Devil (1999), an American Civil War drama. Although the critics still highly praised these two films, they were not particularly successful at the box office, and for a time this interrupted Lee's unbroken popularity – from both general audiences and arthouse aficionados – since his first full-length movie. However, in the late 1990s and 2000s, The Ice Storm had high VHS and DVD sales and rentals and repeated screenings on cable television, which has increased the film's popularity among audiences.

2000s 
Crouching Tiger, Hidden Dragon

In 1999, Hsu Li-kong, Lee's old partner and supporter, invited him to make a movie based on the traditional "wuxia" genre concerning the adventures of martial artists in ancient China. Excited about the opportunity to fulfill his childhood dream, Lee assembled a team from the United States, Taiwan, Hong Kong, Malaysia and Mainland China for Crouching Tiger, Hidden Dragon (2000). The film was a surprising success worldwide. With Chinese dialogue and English subtitles, the film became the highest grossing foreign film in many countries, including the United States and the United Kingdom, and was nominated in 10 categories at the Academy Awards, including Best Picture, Best Foreign Language Film, and Best Director. It ended up winning Best Foreign Language Film and three technical awards.
 
Hulk

In 2003, Lee returned to Hollywood to direct Hulk, his second big-budget movie after the disappointment of Ride with the Devils restricted release. The film received mixed reviews while being a financial success, grossing over $245 million at the box office. After the setback, Lee considered retiring early, but his father encouraged him to continue making movies.

Brokeback Mountain

Lee took on a small-budget, low-profile independent film based on Annie Proulx's Pulitzer Prize-finalist short story, Brokeback Mountain. In a 2005 article by Robert K. Elder, Lee was quoted as saying, "What do I know about gay ranch hands in Wyoming?" In spite of the director's distance from the subject at hand, Brokeback Mountain showcased Lee's skills in probing the depths of the human heart. The 2005 movie about the forbidden love between two Wyoming sheepherders immediately caught public attention and became a cultural phenomenon, initiating intense debates and becoming a box office hit.

The film was critically acclaimed at major international film festivals and won Lee numerous Best Director and Best Picture awards worldwide. Brokeback Mountain was the most acclaimed film of 2005, winning 71 awards and an additional 52 nominations. It won the Golden Lion (best film) award at the Venice International Film Festival and was named 2005's best film by the Los Angeles, New York, Boston, and London film critics. It also won best picture at the 2005 Broadcast Film Critics Association, Directors Guild of America, Writers Guild of America (Adapted Screenplay), Producers Guild of America and the Independent Spirit Awards as well as the Golden Globe Award for Best Motion Picture – Drama, with Lee winning the Golden Globe Award for Best Director. Brokeback Mountain also won Best Film and Best Director at the 2006 BAFTAs. It was nominated for a leading eight Oscars and was the front runner for Best Picture heading into the 5 March ceremony, but lost out to Crash, a story about race relations in Los Angeles, in a controversial upset. He became the first non-white person to win the Best Director at the Academy Awards (which he won again for Life of Pi). In 2006, following his Best Director Oscar, Lee was bestowed the Order of Brilliant Star with Grand Cordon, the second highest civilian award, by the R.O.C. government.

Lust, Caution

His next film was Lust, Caution, which was adapted from a novella by the Chinese author Eileen Chang. The story was written in 1950, and was loosely based on an actual event that took place in 1939–1940 in Japanese-occupied Shanghai, China, during World War II. Similar to Brokeback Mountain, Ang Lee adapted and expanded a short, simple story into a feature film in a way that allows individual figures to develop sophisticated layers of reserved emotions, without being sidetracked by complicated plots or overstuffed material.

Lust, Caution was distributed by Focus Features and premiered at international film festivals in the summer and early fall of 2007. In the U.S., the movie received a NC-17 rating (no children 17 and under admitted) from the MPAA mainly due to several strongly explicit sex scenes. This was a challenge to the film's distribution because many theater chains in the United States refuse to show NC-17 films. The director and film studio decided not to appeal the decision. Lee removed 9 minutes from the film to make the content suitable for minor audiences in order to be permitted to show Lust, Caution in mainland China.

Lust, Caution captured the Golden Lion from the 2007 Biennale Venice Film Festival, making Lee the winner of the highest prize for the second time in three years (Lee is one of only four filmmakers to have won the Golden Lion twice). When Lust, Caution was played in Lee's native Taiwan in its original full-length edition, it was very well received. Staying in Taiwan to promote the film and to participate in a traditional holiday, Lee got emotional when he found that his work was widely applauded by fellow Taiwanese. Lee admitted that he had low expectations for this film from the U.S. audience since "its pace, its film language;– it's all very Chinese." The film was ignored by the Oscars, receiving no nominations. It was snubbed from consideration in the Best Foreign Language Film category; after being officially submitted by Taiwan, the academy ruled that an insufficient number of Taiwanese nationals had participated in the production, thus disqualifying it from further consideration.

Lee was chosen to be president of the jury for the 2009 Venice Film Festival.

2010s
Life of Pi

Lee's next film after 2009's Taking Woodstock was Life of Pi, which was adapted from the novel of the same name written by Yann Martel.

The story was a retrospective first-person narrative from Pi, a then 16-year-old boy from India, who is the only human to survive the sinking of a freighter on the way from India to Canada. He finds himself on a lifeboat with an orangutan, a hyena, a wounded zebra and a Bengal tiger. During this unlikely journey, young Pi questions his belief in God and the meaning of life. The novel was once considered impossible to make into a movie, but Lee persuaded 20th Century Fox to invest $120 million and heavily relied on 3D special effects in post-production. Unlike most other sci-fi precedents, Lee explores the artistic horizon of applying 3D effects and pushes the boundary of how this technology can serve the movie's artistic vision. The movie made its commercial premiere during Thanksgiving weekend of 2012 in the US and worldwide, and became a critical and box office success. In January 2013, Life of Pi earned 11 Academy Award nominations, including Best Picture, Best Director, Best Adapted Screenplay and Best Visual Effects. He went on to win the Academy Award for Best Director.

In 2013, he was selected as a member of the main competition jury at the 2013 Cannes Film Festival.

Directing for television

In March 2013, it was announced that Lee would direct a television pilot for the drama series Tyrant, created by Gideon Raff and developed by Howard Gordon and Craig Wright. Production was scheduled for the summer of 2013 for the FX series. However, Lee decided to quit the project to take a break from his hectic schedule.

Billy Lynn's Long Halftime Walk

Lee next directed Billy Lynn's Long Halftime Walk based on the novel of the same name. It was his first film since winning the Oscar for Best Director for Life of Pi. The film was released in November 2016, and received a mixed response from audiences and critics alike and was a box office failure.

Gemini Man

In April 2017, Ang Lee began discussions with Skydance Media to helm an action thriller film, Gemini Man, that follows a senior DIA official being hunted by a young clone of himself right as he is about to retire from the agency. Will Smith was cast in the lead role. In January 2018, Clive Owen and Mary Elizabeth Winstead had been cast as the antagonist and female lead respectively. The film was released on 11 October 2019 to negative reviews and flopped at the box office.

Upcoming projects
In 2013, Ang Lee began development on a film dramatising Joe Frazier and Muhammad Ali's heavyweight title fight, known as the Thrilla in Manila. The film was to be produced by Universal with a screenplay written by Peter Morgan, but Lee later put it on hold in 2014 in order to make Billy Lynn's Long Halftime Walk. In December 2015, it was announced that the project, tentatively titled Thrilla in Manila, now with Studio 8, would be his next film after Gemini Man. David Oyelowo and Ray Fisher were reportedly Lee's top choices for the leading roles of Frazier and Ali, respectively, and he hoped to film in 3D.

Ang Lee announced in November 2022 that he is working on a biopic on the life of Bruce Lee starring his son, Mason Lee.

Personal life
Lee lives in Larchmont, in Westchester County, New York, with his wife, Jane Lin, a microbiologist. They married in 1983 and have two sons, including Mason. Lee is sometimes described as a naturalized US citizen but has said he is a permanent resident of the United States. Lee has stated that he believes in the Taoist-Buddha.

Filmography
Lee has been involved in the process of filmmaking in various capacities, though the highlight of his career and legacy is his directorial work. The following are Lee's various credits.

Lee also directed the commercial Chosen (2001).

Acting credits

Awards 

In 2003, Lee was ranked 27th in The Guardian 40 best directors. In August 2007, Lee was named the 41st greatest director of all time in a poll by Total Film magazine. Lee has also received awards from the French Government including becoming a Knight of the French Ordre des Arts et des Lettres (2012). and a Knight of the French Legion of Honor (2021) In 2020 he received a BAFTA Fellowship for his Outstanding Contributions to British Cinema.

On 30 November 2021, Lee received the Presidential Culture Award in the arts and culture category from Taiwan's president Tsai Ing-wen.

Recurring collaborators
Ang Lee has had a career-long collaboration with producer and screenwriter James Schamus and editor Tim Squyres. He has also worked several times with music composer Mychael Danna and a few times with Danny Elfman.

Notes 
 a. In the 2007 book The Cinema of Ang Lee: The Other Side of the Screen, Whitney Crothers Dilley has analyzed in detail the striking diversity of Lee's films, as well as Lee's recurring themes of alienation, marginalization, and repression. Many of Lee's films, particularly his early Chinese trilogy, have also focused on the interactions between modernity and tradition.
 b. Mychael Danna was originally hired to score Hulk, but he was removed from the project, apparently at the request of the studio, and another composer completed the final score. Ang Lee spoke publicly about this in 2012 at a director's roundtable, calling it the moment he regretted most in his career. Danna subsequently received his first Oscar nomination and went on to win that award for scoring Life of Pi, his first reunion with Lee since that time.

References

Further reading
 Dilley, Whitney Crothers. The Cinema of Ang Lee: The Other Side of the Screen. London: Wallflower Press, 2007.
 "Taking Stock of 'Taking Woodstock'" Rushprnews 5 October 2008
 "Ang Lee's movie has a backstory of pure serendipity" by Dan Bloom, Taipei Times. 11 October 2008
 Cheshire, Ellen. Ang Lee. London: Pocket Essentials, 2001.
 Senses of Cinema: Great Directors Critical Database
 Ang Lee 64th Venice Film Festival press conference
 DGA Quarterly interview
 Ang Lee: A Life in Pictures at BAFTA
 A Never-Ending Dream - A short essay by Ang Lee on his road to success

External links

 
 

1954 births
BAFTA fellows
Best Directing Academy Award winners
Best Director BAFTA Award winners
Best Director Golden Globe winners
Chevaliers of the Ordre des Arts et des Lettres
Directors Guild of America Award winners
Directors of Best Foreign Language Film Academy Award winners
Directors of Golden Bear winners
Directors of Golden Lion winners
English-language film directors
Fellows of the American Academy of Arts and Sciences
Film directors from New York (state)
Film producers from New York (state)
Filmmakers who won the Best Film BAFTA Award
Filmmakers who won the Best Foreign Language Film BAFTA Award
Hugo Award winners
Independent Spirit Award for Best Director winners
Living people
Republic of China Navy sailors
National Taiwan University of Arts alumni
People from Larchmont, New York
People from Pingtung County
Recipients of the Order of Brilliant Star
Taiwanese Buddhists
Taiwanese emigrants to the United States
Taiwanese film directors
Taiwanese film producers
Taiwanese screenwriters
Tisch School of the Arts alumni
University of Illinois College of Fine and Applied Arts alumni